Last Round is the seventh studio album by the psychedelic folk band the Holy Modal Rounders, released in 1978 through Adelphi Records.

Track listing

Personnel 

The Holy Modal Rounders
Peter Stampfel – fiddle, banjo, vocals, design
Steve Weber – guitar, vocals, bass guitar
The Clamtones
Ted Deane – saxophone, clarinet, flute
Dave Reisch – bass guitar
Roger North – drums
Robin Remaily – mandolin, guitar, steel guitar, piano, fiddle, vocals
Richard Tyler – piano

Additional musicians and production
Candace – design
Betty Berkin – vocals on "Poison Sugar"
Kevin Kelly – engineering
Jeff Kracke – engineering
George Marino – mastering
Barbara Mathe – design
Charlie Messing – guitar on "If You Want to Be a Bird/Wild Blue Yonder"
Trudy Rosen – photography
Bob Sasson – photography

References 

1978 albums
Adelphi Records albums
The Holy Modal Rounders albums